Neohercostomus is a genus of flies in the family Dolichopodidae. Many of the species were formerly from "Hercostomus Group III", one of three groups of Afrotropical Hercostomus species created by Igor Grichanov in 1999.

Species
The genus is divided into two subgenera, Neohercostomus and Subhercostomus:

Subgenus Neohercostomus Grichanov, 2011:
N. arzanovi Grichanov, 2011
N. ashleyi Grichanov, 2011
N. duviardi (Couturier, 1978)
N. garambensis (Grichanov, 2004)
N. itineris (Grichanov, 2004)
N. krivokhatskii (Grichanov, 1999)
N. laanmae (Grichanov, 1999)
N. lictor (Parent, 1937)
N. minimus (Parent, 1937)
N. ovchinnikovae (Grichanov, 1999)
N. panteleevae (Grichanov, 1999)
N. pseudolictor (Grichanov, 2004)
N. rezniki (Grichanov, 2004)
N. rodionovae Grichanov, 2011
N. selivanovae Grichanov, 2011
N. storozhenkoi Grichanov, 2011
N. strictilamellatus (Parent, 1937)
N. transitorius (Parent, 1934)
Subgenus Subhercostomus Grichanov, 2011:
N. manningi Grichanov, 2011
N. silvicola Grichanov, 2011
N. turneri (Grichanov, 1999)

References

Dolichopodidae genera
Dolichopodinae
Diptera of Africa